COMTEL Project is a program of the Common Market for Eastern and Southern Africa (COMESA) aimed at creating a regional telecommunications infrastructure for the 21 member states via a fiber backbone. This will help member states get rid of satellite links they currently use for their transit traffic between themselves going via Europe, America and Asia.

Implementation
COMESA reportedly made a deal with Anderberg-Ericsson Consortium of Mauritius as the strategic equity partner but it was later reported that Ericsson would not become an equity partner. On 26 February 2007 it was reported that the COMTEL Project had stalled and that individual member countries would develop their own regional telecommunication infrastructures.

References

Telecommunications in Africa
International organizations based in Africa